The Green Bay Bombers was an indoor football team that played in the Professional Indoor Football League (PIFL) in 1998, and in the Indoor Football League (IFL) in 1999 and 2000. The Bombers franchise was owned by Keary Ecklund. The team office was based in Neenah, Wisconsin, and played their games at the Brown County Veterans Memorial Arena. The Bombers were coached by Mario Russo for the 1998 PIFL season and part of the 1999 IFL season and by Bud Keyes for the remainder of the 1999 and 2000 IFL seasons.

History
The Bombers played four preseason Professional Indoor Football League (PIFL) games in 1998. Losing only once:

February 18 – Madison Mad Dogs 22 at Green Bay Bombers 64
February 23 – Green Bay Bombers 45 at Madison Mad Dogs 39
March 7 – Green Bay Bombers 32 at Minnesota Monsters 35
March 25 – Colorado Wildcats 39 at Green Bay Bombers 53

The Green Bay Bombers tied with their sister team, Madison Mad Dogs, for the second best record in the PIFL with a 10–4 record. In the playoffs, the Bombers had to travel to Madison in the first round. They lost 19–46.

Keary Ecklund took his Bombers and Mad Dogs teams and defected from the PIFL to form the Indoor Football League (IFL). In 1999, the team finished with the second best record in the league at 9–3. The start of the season was not pretty, as the team lost two of their first three games, both loses to Peoria. The week before the playoffs, the Bombers beat Duluth, 52–15. Despite the great regular season record, the team was forced to travel to Lincoln in the playoffs. The Bombers brought back a 44–34 victory and a trip to Peoria for the IFL Gold Cup Championship. The Bombers won, 63–60.

The following year was very similar. After a mediocre 6–4 start, the Bombers won their final four games by large margins. After being routed 40–16 by Peoria, the Bombers took their frustrations out on LaCrosse to get the four game streak started, 62–26. The Bombers' actually got a home playoff game this time around and they took advantage of it, crushing Dayton, 64–23. Their bid for a repeat championship ended the following week, with a 21–10 loss at Steel Valley. When the IFL was sold, the Bombers disappeared.

In 2003, Green Bay got an AF2 team, the Green Bay Blizzard.

Season-by-season 

|-
| colspan="6" align="center" | Green Bay Bombers (PIFL)
|-
|1998 || 10 || 4 || 0 || 3rd League || Lost Semifinal (Madison)
|-
| colspan="6" align="center" | Green Bay Bombers (IFL)
|-
|1999 || 9 || 3 || 0 || 2nd Northern || Won Semifinal (Lincoln Lightning)Won Gold Cup I (Peoria)
|-
|2000 || 10 || 4 || 0 || 2nd EC Northern || Won Round 1 (Dayton)Won Quarterfinal (S.V. Smash)Lost Semifinal (Peoria)
|-
!Totals || 32 || 13 || 0
|colspan="2"| (including playoffs)

External links 
 Rick's Sports Photos (GB Bombers pics)

Professional Indoor Football League teams
Indoor Football League (1999–2000) teams
American football teams in Wisconsin
Sports in Green Bay, Wisconsin
1997 establishments in Wisconsin
2000 disestablishments in Wisconsin
American football teams established in 1997
American football teams disestablished in 2000